Home is the BoDeans' third studio album, and was released in 1989. It peaked at number 94 on the Billboard 200 chart.

The album's sixth track, "You Don't Get Much" appears in the 1989 movie The Wizard during the opening scene.

Overview
In 1987, the band met producer/engineer Jim Scott while recording with Robbie Robertson on his debut album. They began recording with him in 1988. Following the mixed reception of Outside Looking In, the band wished to approach their next album differently. They added keyboardist Michael Ramos to their lineup and recruited Kenny Aronoff, known for his work with John Mellencamp, to record drums. Most of the tracking was done live in an abandoned shoe factory in downtown Milwaukee, a space that they had previously rented for rehearsals. Over 22 songs were recorded during this time, several of which can be found on the Leftovers rarities collection. In many ways, the album continued along both the roots-influenced sound of their debut and the harder-hitting 80's rock sound of their second record. U2's influence was also evident on this album through Neumann's ambient guitar playing. Overall, the album was very well received by fans and critics.

Reception

Music critic William Ruhlmann, writing for AllMusic, wrote of the album: "Things had changed for this band over three albums: initially, they sounded so style-bound that you wondered if any growth was possible, but with this album they were charging off in half-a -dozen directions at once." Likewise, Fred Goodman of Rolling Stone said, "That the BoDeans are able to rise above the song's one-from-column-A, one-from-column-B structure and create a deeply moving and personal piece of music bodes well for their future. Someday soon the BoDeans are gonna get to that place where they really wanna go and they'll walk in the sun."

Track listing
All songs written by Kurt Neumann and Sam Llanas.
 "When the Love is Goob (I Mean Good)" – 4:02
 "Beautiful Rain" – 4:17
 "Fire in the Hole" – 0:22
 "Good Work" – 2:53
 "No One" – 4:02
 "You Don't Get Much" – 4:46
 "Hand in Hand" – 4:01
 "Worlds Away" – 3:44
 "Far Far Away from My Heart" – 4:24
 "Brand New" – 4:06
 "Red River" – 4:05
 "Beaujolais" – 4:36
 "Sylvia" – 3:44
 "I'll Be There (Voodoo)" – 4:03
 "Tied Down and Chained" – 3:37

Personnel
BoDeans
 Kurt Neumann – vocals, guitar, acoustic guitar, electric guitar, cello, omnichord, tambourine, percussion, bells, sound effects, background vocals
 Sam Llanas – vocals, acoustic guitar,  harmonica, sound effects
 Bob Griffin – bass guitar
 Michael Ramos – strings, accordion, piano, electric piano, Clavinet, organ, keyboards
Additional personnel
 Kenny Aronoff – drums, percussion (tracks 1, 2, 4, 5, 6, 7, 15)
 Rick Jaegar – drums (10, 11)
 Bo Conlon – drums (8, 13)
 Susan Julian – piano, organ, strings (1, 2, 4, 5, 6, 7, 8, 10, 11, 15)
 Marshall Crenshaw – vocals (10)
 Bobbyzio Moore – saxophone (1)
 Derek Nakamoto – strings, cello (6, 14)
 Jim Scott – white noise (9)

References

1989 albums
BoDeans albums
Slash Records albums